Chah Faleh-ye Gharbi (also Romanized as Chāh Fa‘leh-ye Gharbī; also known as Chāh Barrā) is a village in Qaleh Qazi Rural District, Qaleh Qazi District, Bandar Abbas County, Hormozgan Province, Iran. At the 2006 census, its population was 583, in 139 families.

References 

Populated places in Bandar Abbas County